Parafilaroides is a genus of nematodes belonging to the family Filaroididae.

The species of this genus are found in Northern America.

Species:

Parafilaroides decorus 
Parafilaroides gullandae 
Parafilaroides gymnurus 
Parafilaroides hispidus 
Parafilaroides hydrurgae 
Parafilaroides measuresae 
Parafilaroides nanus 
Parafilaroides normani 
Parafilaroides prolificus

References

Nematodes